James McWilliams may refer to:

 James E. McWilliams (born 1968), professor of history
 James C. McWilliams, professor of oceanic and atmospheric modeling